Alan Tate (born 1982) is an English footballer.

Alan or Allen Tate may also refer to:

Writers
 Alan Tate (journalist) Australian journalist and environmentalist, joint Gold Walkley winner 1989
 Allen Tate (1899–1979), American poet and essayist, frequently misspelled "Alan Tate" in print sources

Others
 Alan Tate (chess player), winner of Scottish Chess Championship
 Allen Tate (musician), singer in American music group San Fermin

See also
Alan Tait (disambiguation)